Ryszard Reiff (July 4, 1923, Warsaw – December 9, 2007) was a Polish politician, lawyer, publicist and resistance fighter. He was a deputy to the Polish parliament (Sejm) during the 1968 Polish political crisis and again during the Martial law in Poland.

Biography
Born in Warsaw in 1923, Reiff studied law at the University of Warsaw. After German invasion of Poland, he took part in the Polish resistance movement in World War II. He was a member of the right-leaning Konfederacja Narodu (Confederation of the Nation) underground organization and commanded one of the first units of the Uderzeniowe Bataliony Kadrowe (Cadre Strike Battalions). Later, he became a member of the Armia Krajowa (Home Army) by default as the Konfederacja Narodu merged with it, and fought against Nazi Germans near Navahrudak. As a member of Armia Krajowa, he was arrested by the Soviet NKVD, and imprisoned for two years (1944-1946).

In 1946 after the Soviet liberation, he started work as a publicist, becoming involved with the pro-communist, but also pro-Catholic faction in the Party. First, he worked in Dziś i Jutro newspaper, and from 1950 to 1953 he was a chief editor of Słowo Powszechne daily and publishing arm of the secular Catholic Polish government sponsored PAX Association, during the darkest years of Stalinism in Poland. In 1976, he became PAX deputy director, and in 1979, its full director. He adopted a position supportive of Solidarity, an independent Polish trade union. A Catholic intellectual, he was a committed critic of Polish government policies, and he once urged a coalition to be formed of leaders from Solidarity, the Polish United Workers' Party, and the Catholic Church, advocating "the establishment of a corporatist arrangement between major political actors as the only way to stabilize Poland's political situation and resolve the deepening economic crisis." From 1965 to 1969 and from 1980 to 1985 he was a deputy to the Polish parliament (Sejm).

On the night of December 12/13, 1981, martial law was proclaimed in Poland. In an effort to try to make the implementation of martial law appear legal, the Polish military ordered the Polish Council of State—a collective presidency—to approve it by a formal vote. Reiff was the only member of the Council of State to vote against the measure, and he lost his position in the council the following year. In January 1982, he was removed from his leadership of PAX by several members of the organization. Some observers were reported to have concluded that this was because those members wanted to change the direction of PAX towards a pro-government stance similar to what it held in the 1950s, though one source contends that the removal was engineered by the leadership of the Polish government in an effort to re-assert its control over the group. From 1980 to 1985, he was once again a Sejm deputy.

With the coming fall of communism in Poland, from 1989 to 1991 he was a member of the Solidarity Citizens' Committee, and joined the Democratic Union party.

He was a chairman of the Association of Sybiraks (Polish exiles to Siberia). Between 1939 and 1941, and 1944 and 1953, around 1.8 million Poles were deported to the Russian region of Siberia, resulting in 500 000 deaths. Ostensibly, the deportations occurred to those who had resisted the Soviet takeover of eastern Poland in 1939, assisted the Nazis during the Second World War, and who were members of the Polish Home Army—an anti-Communist resistance group during the war. A number of human rights groups in Poland protesting against the deportations that occurred, formed the Siberian Union in 1988 with Reiff as its leader.

He died on 9 December 2007 in Warsaw.

Footnotes

1923 births
2007 deaths
Politicians from Warsaw
People from Warsaw Voivodeship (1919–1939)
PAX Association members
Democratic Union (Poland) politicians
Members of the Polish Sejm 1965–1969
Members of the Polish Sejm 1980–1985
Members of the Senate of Poland 1989–1991
Home Army members
Polish deportees to Soviet Union
Polish people detained by the NKVD
Commanders with Star of the Order of Polonia Restituta
Officers of the Order of Polonia Restituta
Knights of the Order of Polonia Restituta
Recipients of the Order of the Banner of Work
Recipients of the Silver Cross of the Virtuti Militari
Recipients of the Cross of Valour (Poland)